Alexsandro de Souza (born 14 September 1977), commonly known as Alex, is a Brazilian football manager, pundit and retired footballer, who played as an attacking midfielder. He is the current head coach of Avaí.

Alex is a former captain of the Brazil national team and Turkish club Fenerbahçe; throughout his career, he also played for Coritiba, Palmeiras, Flamengo and Cruzeiro in Brazil, and Parma in the Italian Serie A.

Alex first played professionally for Coritiba, a Brazilian football club from the state of Paraná, where he stayed from 1995 to 1997, when he was sold to Palmeiras, from São Paulo. When he was playing for Palmeiras where he became a national star, in Brazil. He conquered for the Estádio Palestra Itália club a Copa Libertadores title, in 1999, a Rio-São Paulo cup title in 2000 and a Copa do Brasil title and a Copa Mercosur title in 1998. He left Palmeiras and signed with Flamengo, of Rio de Janeiro in 2000.

In 2000, he returned to Palmeiras for a few months and then signed with Cruzeiro, where he stayed until 2002, when he returned to Palmeiras. After another great season, Alex was sold to Parma, of Italy. There he had a hard time with coach Cesare Prandelli, and eventually returned to Cruzeiro, after playing only friendly matches for the Italian team. At Cruzeiro Alex had the best performance in his career. Made team captain and wearing jersey number 10, he led his team (which also had other remarkable players, such as Deivid, Edu Dracena, Luisão, Maicon, Aristizábal, Zinho, Felipe Melo, Gomes and Cris) to winning the Brazilian triple crown (that is the State Championship, the Brasileirão and the Brazilian Cup). Cruzeiro won the Brazilian League (Brasileirão) with a record-breaking 100 points, 13 ahead of the second place, Santos, with more than 100 goals scored in 46 games. He was eventually transferred to Fenerbahçe SK where he played for 8 years and ended up a club legend. A statue in his honor was erected in Kadıköy, İstanbul.

Over the course of his career, Alex scored 421 goals in 1030 matches and produced a total of 363 assists.

Club career

Early years
Born in Curitiba, Alex first played professionally for Coritiba, a Brazilian football club from the state of Paraná, where he stayed from 1995- 97, when he was sold to Palmeiras, from São Paulo. When he was playing for Palmeiras where he became a national star, in Brazil. He conquered for the Parque Antárctica club a Libertadores da América cup title, in 1999, a Rio-São Paulo cup title in 2000 and a Copa do Brasil title and a Mercosul cup title in 1998. He left Palmeiras and signed with Flamengo, of Rio de Janeiro in 2000.

In 2000, he returned to Palmeiras for a few months and then signed with Cruzeiro, where he stayed until 2002, when he returned to Palmeiras. After another great season, Alex was sold to Parma, of Italy. There he had a hard time with coach Cesare Prandelli, and eventually returned to Cruzeiro, after playing only friendly matches for the Italian team. Made team captain and wearing jersey number 10, he led his team (which also had other remarkable players, such as Deivid, Edu Dracena, Luisão, Maicon, Aristizábal, Zinho, Felipe Melo, Gomes and Cris) to winning the Brazilian triple crown (that is the State Championship, the Brasileirão and the Brazilian Cup). Cruzeiro won the Brazilian League (Brasileirão) with a record-breaking 100 points, 13 ahead of the second place, Santos, with more than 100 goals scored in 46 games.

Fenerbahçe
	
Alex was then sold by Cruzeiro in 2004 for 5 million euro to Fenerbahçe. He became Fenerbahçe captain after the team's captain Ümit Özat's transfer to Köln and vice-captains Tuncay's transfer to Middlesbrough and Rüştü Reçber's transfer to rival Beşiktaş. Alex scored his 100th goal in the Süper Lig for Fenerbahçe on 13 November 2010 against Gaziantepspor when they lost 2–1. At 33 years of age Alex scored a hat-trick against Bucaspor in the first 35 minutes of the game. Fenerbahçe won the match 5–2. His first goal in this game was Fenerbahçe's 3000th goal in the Süper Lig, so his kit and shoes used in the Bucaspor match are now shown in the club's museum. On 9 February 2011, he signed another two-year contract with Fenerbahçe.

On 15 May 2011, he scored five goals, including three penalties and a free-kick, in a 6–0 win against Ankaragücü.

After Fenerbahçe's league title for the year 2010–11, Alex won the golden boot award with 28 goals for the season, nine more than second place Burak Yılmaz. He made his 900th career appearance on 12 September 2011 in the opening match of the Super Lig season, a 1–0 victory against Orduspor. In the Turkish Cup final on 16 May 2012 against Bursaspor, Alex netted Fenerbahçe's fourth and final goal of a 4–0 victory and was named the game's "Man of the Match".

On 15 September 2012, while Alex was still under contract with Fenerbahçe, a fan-funded statue of the player was unveiled in Kadıköy Yoğurtçu park. Alex's last goal for Fenerbahçe came on 20 September in the Europa League, scoring Fenerbahçe's second goal in a 2–2 draw with Marseille. Alex's last appearance for the club came on 29 September, playing the first half of a 2–0 defeat to Kasımpaşa in the Süper Lig. After a rift with coach Aykut Kocaman over the team's system, his contract with Fenerbahçe was terminated on 1 October. With Fenerbahçe he has concluded his impressive career in Turkey with 136 assists and 171 goals in 341 games. He left just five goals shy of matching the club record for league goals with 136 goals, held by former striker Aykut Kocaman.

Coritiba
After he rarely featured for Fenerbahçe throughout the early part of the 2012–13 campaign, managing just five league appearances through October, Alex joined Brazilian side Coritiba on 18 October 2012 for an undisclosed fee. He made his debut for his boyhood club on 31 January 2013, playing the full ninety in a 1–0 defeat of J. Malucelli in Campeonato Paranaense play. His first goal for his new club came on 9 February in a 1–1 draw with Arapongas, scoring the equalizing goal three minutes after Wellington Indio's opener in the 47th minute. Alex scored the solitary goal of the game against Londrina on 3 March, starting a run of nine straight matches where the player scored, netting 12 goals. Included in this goal-scoring run was a brace in a 6–0 defeat of Rio Branco on 13 April. Alex finished the Campeonato Paranaense campaign by scoring a brace in Coritiba's 3–1 defeat of Atlético Paranaense on 12 May, securing a 5–3 aggregate win in the final as Coritiba claimed a record 37th state title.
In October 2014, Alex announced his retirement from football. His last game was a 3–2 win against Bahia, on 7 December 2014.

Managerial career
On 5 April 2021, Alex joined São Paulo after being appointed the head coach of the under-20 team. On 28 October 2022, he left the club.

On 16 November 2022, Alex was appointed head coach of Avaí, freshly relegated from the top tier.

Personal life
Alex married Daianne in 2000. The couple have two daughters and one son: Maria Eduarda, born in 2004, Antonia, born in 2006 and Felipe born in 2010. 
He features prominently in Puma advertising and also has a modeling contract with Armani. Alex's father-in-law is the former president of Coritiba.
After his retirement, Alex started to work on ESPN Brasil as a pundit and presenter for interview show Papo Cabeça.

Career statistics

Club

International

Manager

Honours 
Palmeiras
 Copa do Brasil: 1998
 Copa Mercosur: 1998
 Copa Libertadores: 1999
 Torneio Rio-São Paulo: 2000
 Copa dos Campeões: 2000

Flamengo
 Campeonato Carioca: 2000
 Taça Rio: 2000

Cruzeiro
 Campeonato Brasileiro Série A: 2003
 Copa do Brasil: 2003
 Campeonato Mineiro: 2003, 2004
 Copa Sul-Minas: 2001, 2002

Fenerbahçe
 Süper Lig: 2004–05, 2006–07, 2010–11
 Turkish Cup: 2011–12
 Turkish Super Cup: 2007, 2009

Coritiba
 Campeonato Paranaense: 2013

Brazil
 Copa América: 1999, 2004

Brazil U23
 CONMEBOL Pre-Olympic Tournament: 2000

Brazil U20
 South American Youth Championship: 1992, 1995

Individual
 Campeonato Paranaense Revelation: 1995
 Campeonato Paranaense Best Player: 1996
 Campeonato Paranaense Best Midfielder: 1997
 Copa Mercosur Best Player: 1998
 IFFHS World's Top Goal Scorer: 1999 (3rd place)
 Troféu Telê Santana Best Midfielder: 2002
 Troféu Telê Santana Star of the Year: 2003
 Bola de Ouro: 2003
 Bola de Prata: 2003
 Copa América Team of the Tournament: 2004
 Turkish Cup top scorer: 2004–05
 Footballer of the year in Turkey: 2005, 2010
 Süper Lig Gol Kralı: 2006–07 (19 goals), 2010–11 (28 goals)
 UEFA Champions League top assist provider: 2007–08 (6 assists)
 Turkish Cup Best Player: 2011–12

References

External links

 

1977 births
Living people
Brazilian evangelicals
Footballers from Curitiba
Brazilian footballers
Association football midfielders
Coritiba Foot Ball Club players
Sociedade Esportiva Palmeiras players
Parma Calcio 1913 players
CR Flamengo footballers
Cruzeiro Esporte Clube players
Fenerbahçe S.K. footballers
Campeonato Brasileiro Série A players
Süper Lig players
Brazil under-20 international footballers
Olympic footballers of Brazil
Brazil international footballers
1999 Copa América players
1999 FIFA Confederations Cup players
Footballers at the 2000 Summer Olympics
2001 Copa América players
2003 FIFA Confederations Cup players
2004 Copa América players
Copa América-winning players
Copa Libertadores-winning players
Brazilian expatriate footballers
Brazilian expatriate sportspeople in Italy
Brazilian expatriate sportspeople in Turkey
Expatriate footballers in Italy
Expatriate footballers in Turkey
Brazilian football managers
Avaí FC managers